Péter Szijjártó (born 30 October 1978) is a Hungarian politician who has been Minister of Foreign Affairs and Trade since 2014. He previously served as Deputy Minister of Foreign Affairs and Trade and Parliamentary State Secretary of the Ministry of Foreign Affairs and Trade. In June 2012, he was appointed to State Secretary for Foreign Affairs and External Economic Relations of the Prime Minister's Office.

Szijjártó joined Fidesz in 1998. He was elected to member of the municipal government in the same year in the city of Győr, and then he obtained a mandate between 2006 and 2010 again. In 2005 he was elected to president of Fidelitas, the youth organization of Fidesz and he occupied this position until 2009. He first became a member of the National Assembly in 2002. He received mandates in 2006, 2010, 2014 and 2018 as well; currently he is serving his fourth term as Member of Parliament.

In December 2021, Szijjártó was awarded the Order of Friendship, which he received from Russian Foreign Minister Sergey Lavrov in Moscow.

Early life
Péter Szijjártó was born in Komárom on 30 October 1978. After spending a half year in the United States, he finished his secondary studies at Czuczor Gergely Benedictine Secondary Grammar School of Győr in 1997. He graduated from the Budapest University of Economic Sciences and Public Administration (today Corvinus University of Budapest) majoring in international relations and sports management.

Career

As municipal politician (1998-2010)
Szijjártó began his political career in 1998, when he was elected as the youngest member of the Municipal Assembly of Győr. He served as vice chairman of the education, culture and sports committee. He was one of the founders and the first president of the Fidelitas, youth organization of Fidesz in Győr. He was elected a vice president of the Fidelitas 2001, and also became a member of the Fidesz's national board.

As National Assemblyman (2002-present)
Szijjártó has been a member of the National Assembly of Hungary since 2002. He was the youngest Member of the Parliament from 2002 to 2006. He was appointed Vice Chairman of the Committee on Youth and Sport Affairs in 2004, holding the office until 2006. He was elected President of the Fidelitas in 2005, replacing András Gyürk. He also became the leader of the Győr branch of Fidesz. He held the position of Fidelitas leader until 2009, when Péter Ágh was nominated as the new president.

Before Fidesz came to power in May 2010, Szijjártó was the spokesman of Fidesz – Hungarian Civic Union. He served as personal spokesman of the Hungarian Prime Minister Viktor Orbán from 2010 to 2012.

On 4 July 2012 Orbán nominated Szijjártó as the chairman of eight economic committees to boost the Hungarian government's policy of opening up trade with countries to the east as well as consolidating Hungary's role in supporting the Western Balkan nations' EU integration, the Central European Visegrád Group of heads of government announced the same day. Szijjártó, who had taken up the post on 2 July, also worked to strengthen co-operation with neighbouring countries.<ref>[http://www.visegradgroup.eu/news/peter-szijjarto-to-head  Peter Szijjártó to head eight mixed economic committees in Hungary.., MTI News Agency, Budapest, quoted by International Visegrád Fund, Bratislava] Accessed: 29 November 2012.</ref>

As Foreign Minister (2014-present)
Prime Minister Viktor Orbán appointed Szijjártó as Minister of Foreign Affairs and Trade in September 2014, when his predecessor Tibor Navracsics resigned due to his new position in the European Commission.
2015
During a breakfast meeting of the Israel Council on Foreign Relations in Jerusalem on November 16, 2015, Szijjártó said that Hungary would not place the settlements labeling on products originating from the West Bank. This decision followed the Notice adopted by the European Commission on November 11, 2015, incorporating guidelines to label imports from the Israeli settlements. He considered the aforementioned policy to be "irrational," and even threatening to a potential Israeli-Palestinian dialogue. Szijjártó also addressed the contemporary European migration crisis, describing mass migration as "the greatest challenge that the EU has had to face since its foundation" and condemning European leaders for the misguided policies their political correctness engendered.
2020
Szijjártó visited Cambodia on November 3, 2020 to hold several meetings with high-ranking government officials, and tested positive for COVID-19 the following day after flying to Bangkok. Four close contacts in Cambodia subsequently tested positive, which prompted government officials from 13 Cambodian government ministries, including Prime Minister Hun Sen, to enter quarantine, and contact tracing efforts were made to seven provinces and tests administered on around 1,000 people. The visit resulted in schools, museums, cinemas, entertainment venues, gyms, beer gardens to be closed across Phnom Penh for two weeks. Local media reported that the Hungarian Foreign Ministry had requested for no temperature checks, mandatory mask wearing and alcohol spraying ahead of the meetings.
2021
On 16 October 2021 Szijjártó was interviewed by Al Jazeera English'' during which time he was forced to defend his government's policies from attacks by World Economic Forum members Ursula von der Leyen and Mark Rutte. He explained his Parliament's law on the rights of the parent and child to security against bizarre ideologies and highlighted the preference of his government for referendums to settle outstanding political issues. He clarified that the George Soros-founded and -funded Central European University needed to meet the criteria set out in Hungarian law regarding domestic content and staff that all other Hungarian universities need to meet in order to certify degrees in Hungary, rather than have it be an outlier.

Honours

Orders

See also
List of foreign ministers in 2017
List of current foreign ministers

References

External links

Official website

|-

1978 births
Fidesz politicians
Foreign ministers of Hungary
Living people
Members of the National Assembly of Hungary (2002–2006)
Members of the National Assembly of Hungary (2006–2010)
Members of the National Assembly of Hungary (2010–2014)
Members of the National Assembly of Hungary (2014–2018)
Members of the National Assembly of Hungary (2018–2022)
Members of the National Assembly of Hungary (2022–2026)
People from Komárom
Members of the Fourth Orbán Government
Members of the fifth Orbán government